Shcherbina is a gender-neutral Ukrainian surname. It may refer to

 Alexander Scherbina (born 1988), Russian ice hockey forward
 Boris Shcherbina (1919–1990), Soviet politician, vice-chairman of the Council of Ministers
 Elena Beckman-Shcherbina (1882–1951), Russian pianist and composer
 Grigoriy Schterbina (1868-1903), Russian diplomat
 Mariya Shcherbina (born 1958), Ukrainian mathematician
 Nikolay Shcherbina (1821–1869), Russian poet
 Vladimir Shcherbina (1907–1978), Soviet geochemist and mineralogist

See also
 

Ukrainian-language surnames